I Dream of Christmas is the eighth studio album and first Christmas album by American singer-songwriter Norah Jones. It was released by Blue Note Records on October 15, 2021.

Critical reception

PopMatters editor Peter Piatkowski found that I Dream of Christmas "feels like a soothing salve on what seems like another troubled holiday season. The record is a wonderful soundtrack to the upcoming festivities and should be on the playlist of everyone’s Christmas party."

Track listing
All tracks produced by Leon Michels.

Charts

Weekly charts

Year-end charts

Release history

References

2021 Christmas albums
Blue Note Records albums
Christmas albums by American artists
Norah Jones albums
Pop Christmas albums